Lucky 7 or Lucky Seven may refer to:

Film and television 
 I Can See Your Voice (South Korean season 7), the seventh season of the program of the same name, also alternatively named I Can See Your Voice Lucky 7
 Lucky 7 (film), a 2003 television film starring Kimberly Williams and Patrick Dempsey
 Lucky 7 (TV series), a 2013 American drama series 
 Lucky Seven (TV series), a 2012 Japanese drama series starring Jun Matsumoto and Eita
 Lucky Seven (The Price Is Right), a pricing game on the American game show The Price Is Right
 Lucky 7 (pirate TV station), the first known pirate television station in the U.S.

Games 
 Lucky Seven (game), a game played with drink coasters
 Lucky 7, a former Australian lottery game
 Lucky 7, a fictional item in Mario Kart 7
 Lucky 7 (or Lucky 7s), a type of pull-tab gambling ticket
 Lucky Seven, the weapon wielded by the protagonist of Xenoblade Chronicles 3 Noah.

Music 
 Lucky 7 (band), an American pop-punk band
 Lucky 7 (Chisato Moritaka album), 1993
 Lucky 7 (The Reverend Horton Heat album), 2002
 Lucky 7 (Statik Selektah album), 2015
 Lucky 7, a Roberto Roena album
 Lucky Seven (Bob James album), 1979
 Lucky Seven (Rockapella album), 1996

 Lucky 7 Records, a UK record label established by the band Madness
 Project Lucky Seven, the working title for Payback, a 2012 album by Danny!
 "Lucky Seven", a 1930 song by Howard Dietz and Arthur Schwartz
 "Lucky Seven", a song by AKB48, a B-side of the single "Heavy Rotation"
 "Lucky Seven", a song by Chris Squire from Fish Out of Water

Other uses 
 USS Hope (AH-7), nicknamed Lucky 7, a U.S. Navy ship 1943–1946
 Lucky Seven, an American supermarket chain operated by Market Basket
 Lucky Seven, a custom cap and crest company owned and run by Jay Burridge
 Lucky-7, Czech CubeSat satellite launched in 2019
 Lucky 7, Nippon Professional Baseball's version of the seventh-inning stretch

See also 
 Lucky Number Slevin, a 2006 film
 Lucky (disambiguation)
 But see "Natural or Seven out" in Craps